Sebastián Rakán Dubarbier Bruschini (born 19 February 1986) is an Argentine former professional footballer who played as a left midfielder or left back. He also held a French passport.

Club career
Born in La Plata, Buenos Aires Province, Dubarbier made his senior debut with Club de Gimnasia y Esgrima La Plata in his hometown, later having a short spell with Club Olimpo. In January 2008 he moved abroad, signing with CFR Cluj from Romania.

In February 2010, Dubarbier moved teams and countries again, joining Ligue 1 side FC Lorient. On 14 January of the following year he was loaned to CD Tenerife in Spain, remaining in the country the following seasons.

Dubarbier signed for fellow Segunda División club Córdoba CF on 30 January 2012, also on loan. The move was made permanent in August, and he scored twice during the campaign to help the Andalusians rank in 14th position; he was reconverted in a left back in the process.

On 28 June 2013, Dubarbier joined UD Almería in La Liga for an undisclosed fee. He made his debut in the Spanish top flight on 19 August, starting in a 2–3 home loss to Villarreal CF.

On 24 July 2015, Dubarbier agreed to an extension with the Rojiblancos until 2019. On 7 December of the following year, however, he terminated his contract after alleging personal problems, and joined Estudiantes de La Plata two weeks later.

Dubarbier returned to Spain on 15 June 2018, with the 32-year-old signing a one-year deal at Deportivo de La Coruña as a free agent. He left Galicia after only competitive appearance, and retired in 2020 at Club Atlético Banfield.

Honours
CFR Cluj
Liga I: 2007–08, 2009–10
Cupa României: 2007–08, 2008–09, 2009–10
Supercupa României: 2009

Individual
Foreign Player of the Year in Romania (Gazeta Sporturilor): 2008

References

External links
  
 
 
 
 

1986 births
Living people
Argentine people of French descent
Footballers from La Plata
Argentine footballers
Association football defenders
Association football midfielders
Argentine Primera División players
Club de Gimnasia y Esgrima La Plata footballers
Olimpo footballers
Estudiantes de La Plata footballers
Club Atlético Banfield footballers
Liga I players
CFR Cluj players
Ligue 1 players
FC Lorient players
La Liga players
Segunda División players
CD Tenerife players
Córdoba CF players
UD Almería players
Deportivo de La Coruña players
Argentine expatriate footballers
Expatriate footballers in Romania
Expatriate footballers in France
Expatriate footballers in Spain
Argentine expatriate sportspeople in Romania
Argentine expatriate sportspeople in France
Argentine expatriate sportspeople in Spain